Coloconger meadi is an eel in the family Colocongridae (worm eels/short-tail eels). It was described by Robert H. Kanazawa in 1957. It is a marine, deep-water dwelling eel from the Gulf of Mexico and Suriname in the western central Atlantic Ocean. It dwells at a depth range of 650–925 m. Males can reach a maximum total length of 37.7 cm.

Etymology
The eel is named in honor of ichthyologist Giles W. Mead (1928-2003), who sent the type specimen to Kanazawa.

References

Eels
Taxa named by Robert H. Kanazawa
Fish described in 1957